Barry Evans may refer to:

Barry Evans (actor) (1943–1997), English actor and television performer
Barry Evans (baseball) (born 1955), former Major League Baseball third baseman
Barry Evans (EastEnders), fictional character in the British TV soap opera EastEnders
Barry Evans (footballer, born 1936), Australian footballer for South Melbourne
Barry Evans (footballer, born 1963), Australian footballer for Collingwood
Barry Evans (rugby union) (born 1962), English rugby player